Eudonia asterisca is a moth in the family Crambidae. It was named by Edward Meyrick in 1884 and is endemic to New Zealand. It has been recorded in both the North and South Islands. This species is recorded as being present at sea level up to altitudes of 1350 m. This species has been recorded as inhabiting native podocarp/hardwood forests. The adults of this species are on the wing from December until March although they have also been recorded in October and November. They are attracted to light and have also been trapped via sugar traps.

Taxonomy
This species was first described by Edward Myrick in 1884 using specimens collected at Arthur's Pass, Mount Hutt, Lake Wakatipu in January and named Xeroscopa asterisca. Meyrick added further described the species in 1885. In 1913 Meyrick placed the species within the genus Scoparia. George Hudson described and illustrated this species in the book The butterflies and moths of New Zealand. In 1988 John S. Dugdale placed this species in the genus Eudonia. The male lectotype, collected at Lake Wakatipu by R. W. Fereday, is held at the Natural History Museum, London.

Description

Meyrick described this species as follows:
This species is variable in the intensity of ground colour on its forewings as well as the shading at the tips of its hindwings.

Distribution
It is endemic to New Zealand. This species has been recorded in the North and South Islands at elevations from sea level up to approximately 1350 m.

Habitat and hosts 
This species is known to inhabit lowland to montane areas. It has also been observed in lowland podocarp/hardwood forest.

Behaviour

Adults are on wing from between December until March but has also been recorded in October and November. Adults are attracted to light and have been known to be collected with the use of light as well as sugar traps.

References

Moths described in 1884
Eudonia
Moths of New Zealand
Endemic fauna of New Zealand
Taxa named by Edward Meyrick
Endemic moths of New Zealand